Turritis (commonly known as towercress or tower mustard) is a plant genus in the family Brassicaceae. It contains the following two species:
Turritis glabra  (tower rockcress)
Turritis laxa 

Various other species have formerly been included in Turritis. The following list of synonyms is from BrassiBase version 1.3:
 Turritis alpina  → Arabis ciliata
 Turritis auriculata  → Arabis auriculata
 Turritis brachycarpa  → Boechera grahamii
 Turritis brassica  → Fourraea alpina
 Turritis caerulea  → Arabis caerulea
 Turritis chilensis  → Rorippa coxii
 Turritis ciliata  → Arabis ciliata
 Turritis dregeana  → Turritis glabra
 Turritis drummondii  → Boechera angustifolia
 Turritis falcata  → Boechera falcata
 Turritis gerardii  → Arabis nemorensis
 Turritis grahamii  → Boechera grahamii
 Turritis hirsuta  → Arabis hirsuta
 Turritis hispidula  → Exhalimolobos hispidulus
 Turritis laevigata  → Borodinia laevigata
 Turritis lasiophylla  → Streptanthus lasiophyllus
 Turritis loeselii  → Sisymbrium loeselii
 Turritis macrocarpa  → Turritis glabra
 Turritis mollis  → Crucihimalaya bursifolia
 Turritis nemorensis  → Arabis nemorensis
 Turritis nova  → Arabis nova subsp. nova
 Turritis ochroleuca  → Pseudoturritis turrita
 Turritis patula  → Arabis auriculata
 Turritis patula  → Boechera grahamii
 Turritis pauciflora  → Fourraea alpina
 Turritis planisiliqua  → Arabis planisiliqua
 Turritis praecox  → Arabis planisiliqua
 Turritis pseudoturritis  → Turritis glabra
 Turritis pubescens  → Arabis pubescens subsp. pubescens
 Turritis purpurea  → Arabis verna
 Turritis retrofracta  → Boechera retrofracta
 Turritis sagittata  → Arabis sagittata
 Turritis salsuginea  → Eutrema salsugineum
 Turritis setosa  → Coincya monensis subsp. cheiranthos
 Turritis spathulata  → Arabis eschscholtziana
 Turritis stricta  → Arabis allionii
 Turritis stricta  → Boechera angustifolia
 Turritis stricta  → Turritis glabra

References

External links 
 
 

Brassicaceae
Brassicaceae genera